The Calleja de las Flores is one of the most popular tourist streets of Córdoba city in Andalusia, Spain. Positioned as an intersection of the street Velázquez Bosco, is a narrow street that ends in a plaza.

External links
 City council of Córdoba
 Official website of the street

Streets in Córdoba, Spain